Saint-Laurent-de-Muret is a commune in the Lozère department in southern France. It is located on the east of the Aubrac region (Massif central).

See also
Communes of the Lozère department

References

Saintlaurentdemuret